Ahmadabad-e Harandi (also Romanized as Aḩmadābād-e Harandī; also known as Aḩmadābād) is a village in Sharifabad Rural District, Koshkuiyeh District, Rafsanjan County, Kerman Province, Iran. At the 2006 census, its population was 210, in 53 families.

References 

Populated places in Rafsanjan County